Çayhan is a village in the Kozluk District of Batman Province in Turkey. The village had a population of 140 in 2021.

References 

Villages in Kozluk District
Kurdish settlements in Batman Province